Korea Baptist Theological University and Seminary (KBTUS) is a private higher-education institution in Daejeon, Korea founded in 1953 on the Baptist tradition. It is the only theological institution in the Korea Baptist Convention after the closure of Capital Baptist Theological Seminary in 2006. Established departments include the Department of Theology, Christian Education, Church Music, Social Welfare, Early Childhood Education, Counseling Psychology, and English.

See also 
 List of colleges and universities in South Korea
 Education in South Korea

References

External links 
 Official website
 Official website

Universities and colleges in Daejeon
Private universities and colleges in South Korea
Seminaries and theological colleges in South Korea
Yuseong District
1953 establishments in South Korea
Educational institutions established in 1953